Abdel Salam Haroun (January 18, 1909- April 16, 1988) is one of the most famous researchers of Arab heritage in the twentieth century.

Life
Abdel Salam Mohamed Haroun was born in Alexandria on January 18, 1909, to a family that was very interested in science and culture. He joined Al-Azhar after completing memorizing the Quran and learning the principles of reading and writing and continued to excel in his studies. Until he joined the Dar al-Ulum (House of Science), where he graduated in 1945.

Works
Haron published many books such as Matn ibn Shuja’a, Khizanat al-Adab by al-Baghdadi, Kitab Al-Hayawan, Kitab Al-Bayan wa’l-Tabyin, and many other books.

Honours
Abdel Salam Harun was awarded the King Faisal International Award in 1981 for his efforts to research heritage books, while elected as a general secretary to the Academy of the Arabic Language in Cairo in 1984.

Death
Haroun died on 16 April 1988.

References

20th-century Egyptian historians
People from Alexandria
1909 births
1988 deaths